Manuel "Guajiro" Mirabal (born 5 May 1933) is a Cuban trumpeter, best known for his work with the Buena Vista Social Club.

Biography
"Guajiro" learned trumpet at the age of 18 and began playing professionally in 1951. He joined the jazz band ‘Swing Casino’ in 1953 before forming the ‘Conjunto Rumbavana’ three years later. In 1960, he joined the ‘Orquesta Riverside,’ whose singer Toto Gomez gave him his nickname ‘Guajiro’ Mirabal. There followed stints with various orchestras including ‘Orquesta del ICRT,’ the official orchestra of Cuban state radio and television.

In 1996 "Guajiro" became one of the Cuban musicians who joined American guitarist Ry Cooder for the Buena Vista Social Club collaboration. "Guajiro" went on to play a prominent role playing lead trumpet on both records and performances for the group, featuring in the 1999 movie also titled Buena Vista Social Club. "Guajiro" has since released solo works under the Buena Vista Social Club Presents... umbrella including an album which pays tribute to Cuban music legend Arsenio Rodríguez.
In 2004 Mirabal released an album in partnership with Buena Vista Social Club entitled Buena Vista Social Club Presents Manuel Guajiro Mirabal which was widely acclaimed and became another part of the Buena Vista Social Club collection.
In his years of musical experience, Manuel "Guajiro" Mirabal worked alongside some of the greatest Cuban legends such as Ibrahim Ferrer, Omara Portuondo, Rubén González, Compay Segundo and world-famous guitarist, Ry Cooder.

References

See also

Ibrahim Ferrer
Rubén González
Compay Segundo

1933 births
Living people
Cuban trumpeters
Buena Vista Social Club
World Circuit (record label) artists
Son cubano musicians
Orquesta Riverside members